Philip Bourchier O’Ferrall (also known as Philip O’Ferrall) is a London, UK based media executive.   He is currently the Chief Executive of Outernet Global, a global network of immersive entertainment districts. Prior to this he spent over a decade at Viacom where he worked across brands including MTV, Nickelodeon, Paramount, Comedy Central & Channel 5.

O’Ferrall is a trustee of the Adot Foundation charity and a patron of the Old Hilsdon Foundation. He sits on the organising board of the Edinburgh International Television Festival.  He is an active member of the Royal Television Society, The International Emmy Awards and BAFTA.

A frequent commentator on the changes in broadcasting and associated digital disruption, O'Ferrall is also co-founder and non-executive director of production company Travesty Media, alongside comedian and writer Alan Carr.

In 2017 O’Ferrall was listed as one of the top LGBTi executives in business. The Evening Standard has identified him as one of London's most influential people.  He is a member of the advisory board of the British LGBT Awards. He has a relationship with British actor Scott Neal.

O'Ferrall is a Leadership Fellow of The Society of Leadership Fellows Windsor Castle and a Descendant Member of The Society of the Friends of St George's and Descendants of the Knights of the Garter.

On 27 June 2022, The Sunday Times revealed that O’Ferrall is leading a consortium bid for the UK's Channel 4 Television Network.

References

External links
 Philip O'Ferrall Twitter
 Philip O'Ferrall LinkedIn
 Philip O'Ferrall Instagram

Living people
Paramount International Networks
English gay men
Year of birth missing (living people)
21st-century English LGBT people